Giulia Casoni (born 19 April 1978) is a retired Italian tennis player.

As a junior player, she won 1996 French Open in doubles, while her best professional results include singles quarterfinals at the Internazionali Femminili di Palermo in 1999 and Tier I Italian Open in 2000, and three WTA Tour doubles titles. She was a member of Italy Fed Cup team from 2000 to 2001, and won three doubles titles at WTA tournaments.

Casoni defeated players such as Dominique Monami, Katarina Srebotnik, Mariya Koryttseva, Francesca Schiavone, Émilie Loit and Nuria Llagostera Vives. She also won four singles and 27 doubles titles on the ITF Circuit.

Casoni retired from professional tennis in 2006, after struggling with a knee injury.

Personal life
Casoni was born to Ilario and Angela Casoni, and has a brother Lorenzo.

WTA career finals

Doubles: 4 (3–1)

Junior Grand Slam finals

Girls' doubles: 1 (1–0)

ITF Circuit finals

Singles (4–6)

Doubles (27–10)

References

External links
 
 

1978 births
Italian female tennis players
Living people
Sportspeople from Ferrara
Grand Slam (tennis) champions in girls' doubles
French Open junior champions